Being Mary Jane is an American drama television series created by Mara Brock Akil and starring Gabrielle Union, that debuted January 7, 2014 on BET. The 90-minute-pilot for the series aired on July 2, 2013. The series follows the professional and personal life of successful TV news anchor Mary Jane Paul, who lives in Atlanta and New York City. The series concluded on April 23, 2019.

Being Mary Jane received positive reviews from critics. The series premiere drew more than four million viewers, debuting as BET's highest-rated show. On January 6, 2016, the series was renewed for a fourth season, which premiered on January 10, 2017. It was announced on October 11, 2017, that the series would end. A two-hour film finale was planned to air in 2018, but never came to fruition. On December 7, 2018, BET announced that the film finale date had been pushed back to air on April 16, 2019. On April 1, 2019, it was announced that the film finale date was pushed back a week later to April 23, 2019.

Series overview

Cast and characters

Main
 Gabrielle Union as Pauletta ("Mary Jane Paul") Patterson: a successful TV news anchor for Satellite News Channel (SNC) who remains devoted to a family that does not share her motivation as she juggles her life, her relationships, her work, and commitments. In season four, Mary Jane leaves Atlanta after getting fired from SNC and moves to New York City to work at Great Day USA as a national news correspondent. She eventually works her way up to get back on the anchor chair.
 Lisa Vidal as Kara Lynch: the executive producer of Talk Back (Mary Jane's show) at SNC and Mary Jane's best friend.
 Margaret Avery as Helen Patterson: Mary Jane's overprotective mother, who is battling lupus.
 Latarsha Rose as Dr. Lisa Hudson (seasons 1–3): Mary Jane's best friend since elementary school, an OB/GYN.
 Aaron D. Spears as Mark Bradley (seasons 1–3): a co-anchor at the newsroom and the closeted gay friend of Mary Jane.
 Richard Brooks as Patrick Patterson: Mary Jane's older, less-motivated brother.
 B. J. Britt as Paul Patterson, Jr.: Mary Jane's responsible younger brother.
 Raven Goodwin as Niecy Patterson: Mary Jane's niece; Patrick Patterson's daughter, who is also a mother.
 Richard Roundtree as Paul Patterson, Sr.: Mary Jane's compassionate father.
 Omari Hardwick as Andre Daniels (season 1): Mary Jane's married love interest
 Stephen Bishop as David Paulk (recurring, season 1; main, seasons 2–3): Mary Jane's playboy love interest.

Recurring
 Robinne Lee as Avery Daniels (season 1): Andre's wife, who learns of her husband's affair with Mary Jane.
 Tatom Pender as Tracy: Patrick's girlfriend and mother of their child.
 Brely Evans as Nichelle: Mary Jane's friend and publicist to the stars.
 Kelly Rutherford as Cynthia Phillips (seasons 1–2)
 Navia Robinson (seasons 1–2) and Madison Alsobrook  (season 4) as D'Asia: Patrick and Tracy's daughter
 Ryan Homchick as Lance (seasons 1–3)
 Salli Richardson as Valerie (season 2) one of Mary Jane's friends who is a doctor.
 Gary Dourdan as Sheldon (season 2)
 Kyle Massey as Cameron (season 2) Niecy's ex and the father of their son Treyvion.
 Loretta Devine as Cece (season 3)
 Daniella Alonso as Marisol Esparza (season 3)
 Thomas Jones as Brandon (season 3) one of Mary Jane's lovers
 Paul Rolfes as Aaron Felty (seasons 3–4) one of the lead co-hosts on Good Day USA
 Rita Rucker as Chante (seasons 3–4)
 Michael Ealy as Justin Talbot (season 4) Mary Jane's colleague at Good Day USA and boyfriend and later husband
 Chiké Okonkwo as Lee Truitt (season 4) Mary Jane's ex-boyfriend
 Valarie Pettiford as Ronda Sales (season 4) one of the lead co-hosts on Good Day USA
 Ashton Holmes as Garrett (season 4) the executive producer of Good Day USA
 Julian Walker as Ty (season 4) Mary Jane's stylist
 Cesar Cipriano as Dante (season 4) Niecy's ex and father to their daughter Isbell
 Tian Richards as Jovan (season 4) a mentee to Patrick
 Nicholas Gonzalez as Orlando Lagos (season 4) Kara's fiancé

Guest stars
 Jasmine Dustin as Ana Hoem (season 1)
 Lesley-Ann Brandt as Tamiko Roberts (season 1)
 Sheila Frazier as Catherine Stafford (season 1)
 Darrin Dewitt Henson (season 1)
 Lorraine Toussaint as Aunt Toni, Paul's younger sister and Mary Jane's aunt (season 1)
 Wayne Brady as Sean Anders (season 1)
 Ludacris as Terrence Mitchell (season 1)
 Dorian Missick as Detective Cedric Rawlins (season 1)
 Frances Burnett as Dana Shultz (season 1)
 Ava DuVernay (season 1)
 India Arie as herself (season 2)
 Christina Vidal as Lilly, the sister of Kara (season 2)
 Nina Parker (season 3, episode 6)
 Jill Scott (season 3, episode 5)
 Kelly Rowland as Robin (season 3, episode 6)
 Tamar Braxton as Herself (season 3, episode 10)
 Tamera Mowry as Herself (season 3, episode 10)
 Loni Love as Herself (season 3, episode 10)
 Jeannie Mai as Herself (season 3, episode 10)
 Adrienne Bailon as Herself (season 3, episode 10)
Robert Crayton as Lloyd (season 4)
 Cardi B (season 4)
 Loren "Lo London" Jordan (season 4)
 Dave East (season 4)
 Morris Chestnut as Beau (season 4)
Notes

Production
The show was originally to be called Single Black Female. The series centers on successful broadcast journalist Mary Jane Paul (played by Gabrielle Union) and her professional and private family life while searching for "Mr. Right":

Mary Jane Paul has it all: she's a successful TV news anchor, entirely self-sufficient – an all-around powerhouse who remains devoted to a family that doesn’t share her motivation. As Mary Jane juggles her life, her work and her commitment to her family, we find out how far she's willing to go to find the puzzle pieces that she, and society, insist are missing from her life as a single Black female.

The series was created and produced by Mara Brock Akil, who also created and produced the hit sitcoms Girlfriends and The Game. The pilot episode was filmed in April 2012 at 780 N. Highland Ave. in the Virginia Highland neighborhood of Atlanta.

After the third season, creator Mara Brock Akil left the series and Erica Shelton Kodish was hired as the show's new showrunner for the fourth season. Kodish had previously worked as a writer and producer on shows like CSI: NY, Cold Case and The Good Wife. Speaking about her approach to taking over the show to Buzzfeed, Kodish stated that she wasn't afraid to shake things up. “I was anxious about how viewers were going to react to change in general — any kind of change. But I felt like it really had to happen”.

Controversy
In 2016, Gabrielle Union sued BET over compensation.

Streaming
The complete series is available to stream on Hulu, Paramount+, and BET+ in the United States.

Reception

Critical response
The second and third seasons received positive reviews, specifically praising Gabrielle Union's leading performance, Mara Brock Akil's writing, and directing work by Regina King.

On the review aggregator website Rotten Tomatoes, the first season earned an approval rating of 80% based on 10 reviews, with an average rating of 7.1/10. Metacritic, which uses a weighted average, assigned the pilot a score of 78 out of 100 based on 4 critics reviews, indicating "generally favorable reviews".

Accolades

References

External links
 
 

2010s American black television series
2010s American drama television series
2013 American television series debuts
2019 American television series endings
BET original programming
English-language television shows
Serial drama television series
Television series about journalism
Television series created by Mara Brock Akil
Television shows filmed in Georgia (U.S. state)
Television shows set in Atlanta
Will Packer Productions television shows